The Sky Taipei is a skyscraper under construction in Taipei, Taiwan. Upon completion, it will be the third-tallest building in Taiwan and the second-tallest in Xinyi Special District and Taipei, and will house two luxury hotels by Hyatt: Andaz Taipei and Park Hyatt Taipei. The height of the building will be  with a floor area of 87,464.32 m2, comprising 56 floors above ground as well as 5 basement levels. The planned completion date is the end of 2023. It should open in 2024

History

The location of The Sky Taipei is the former Chinatrust Financial Building, the former headquarters of CTBC Financial Holding, which was built in 1996 and was demolished in 2016 to make way for the new building.

Gallery

See also 
 List of tallest buildings in Taipei
 List of tallest buildings in Taiwan
 Taipei 101
 Shin Kong Life Tower
 85 Sky Tower
 Chinatrust Financial Building

References 

Buildings and structures under construction in Taiwan
Xinyi Special District
Skyscraper hotels in Taipei